Aparna Chandra (born 6 January 1971) is a fashion designer  and stylist from India.

Life
Chandra was born on January 6, 1971, in Delhi. She watched as a child the tailors employed by her mother, Asha, who was a designer of children's clothing. Chandra studied fashion design at the National Institute of Fashion Technology (NIFT) and she worked, as an intern, for Indian designer Rohit Khosla.

After graduation she launched her eponymous fashion line with less ordained clothing. It operated for ten years but there was insufficient interest and she began working as a stylist. In 2015 Elle (India) recalled her designs from the era as notable "[n]ot for being outrageous, ostentatious or opulent, but for their easy simplicity. She created campaigns for Benetton, Ray Ban, Van Heusen and De Beers. In 2014, she returned to design as the head of clothing at Indian lifestyle brand Nicobar. The September 2018 launch of Aparna Chandra for Nicobar marks her first standalone collection in more than a decade.

Design Philosophy

Aparna Chandra is known for her simple aesthetic and easy vibe. She often favours natural fabrics, much white, and pops of colour. She uses lightweight fabrics, fusing little splashes of colour with icons that have come to be her signature. In her lines she often pairs loose and slouchy styles with more structured and streamlined pieces.

References 

National Institute of Fashion Technology alumni
1971 births
Living people
Indian women fashion designers
Women from Delhi
People from New Delhi